Matthew Paul Hyde is a British record producer, mix engineer, and musician. In 2008, he provided mix engineering with Colin Richardson on Slipknot's Grammy Award-nominated albums, All Hope Is Gone and 9.0: Live. His studio is based in London.

Professional background 
Hyde has worked with Gallows, Funeral for a Friend, Bullet for My Valentine, Trivium, Machine Head, As I Lay Dying, Chimaira, Ash, Razorlight, and Dååth.

His work on Urma Sellinger's debut album was released on 26 January 2012.

Discography

References

External links 
 

Living people
British record producers
British audio engineers
Year of birth missing (living people)
Place of birth missing (living people)